Portalen Pass is a mountain pass between Domen Butte and Pilarryggen, in the Borg Massif of Queen Maud Land. Mapped by Norwegian cartographers from surveys and air photos by Norwegian-British-Swedish Antarctic Expedition (NBSAE) (1949–52) and named Portalen (the gateway).

Mountain passes of Queen Maud Land
Princess Martha Coast